Muthyamantha Muddu is a 1989 Telugu-language thriller film produced by K. Benarjee under the Pramoda Art Films banner, Presented by K. S. Rama Rao and directed by Ravi Raja Pinisetty. It stars Rajendra Prasad and Seetha, with music composed by Hamsalekha. The film is based on Yandamuri Veerendranath novel Thiller. Hamsalekha used the tune of two songs from two different Kannada movies in this movie.

Plot

Vidyadhari (Seeta) is an independent woman who likes to work hard and be sincere. She hates the likes of men because of a past incident in her life that scarred her emotionally. One day, her serpentine boss Chakradhar (Sudhakar), whose plan to bed her backfires when a strange man Anudeep (Rajendra Prasad) walks into her office and turns Chakradhar's plan against him and leaves her with a mystery shrouding his past. The story shows how Anudeep always shows up at the very moment Vidyadhari lands in trouble. This perplexes her, but the truth is far stranger than fiction. Who is Anudeep and what his true intentions?

Cast
Rajendra Prasad as Anudeep
Seetha as Vidyadhari
Gollapudi Maruti Rao as Prof. Ranganatham
Murali Mohan as Ravi Sastry
Sudhakar as Chakradhar
Brahmanandam as S. I. Viswanatham
Ali as Rikshawala
Ranganath as Commissioner Dharma Rao
Prasad Babu as Sampath
Narayana Rao as Rama Rao
Kanta Rao as Anudeep's father
Dham as Priest
Annapurna as Anudeep's mother
Divyavani as Vishali

Soundtrack

Music composed by Hamsalekha. Lyrics were written by Veturi. Music released on Lahari Music Company.

Hamsalekha used the tune of two songs from two different Kannada movies starring Ravichandran in this movie. The song Premalekha Raasa was the reused version of the song Aakaradalli Gulabi Rangide from the 1988 Kannada movie Anjada Gandu. The song Ichcohuko was the reused version of the song Yaavudo Ee Bombe with a tune in between taken from the tune of the line Neenenayya Maayagaaranu from another song Sri Krishna Bandanu - both from the 1989 Kannada movie Yuga Purusha.

Awards
Seetha won Nandi Special Jury Award

References

External links

1980s Telugu-language films
Indian thriller films
Films scored by Hamsalekha
Films based on Indian novels
Films directed by Ravi Raja Pinisetty
Films based on novels by Yandamuri Veerendranath
1989 thriller films